Hachem Abbès (born December 1, 1986) is a Tunisian footballer who currently plays for Al-Nahda .

Career

Club
In August 2011, he was loaned to Widzew Łódź on a half-year deal.

References

External links
 

1986 births
Living people
Tunisian footballers
Tunisian expatriate footballers
CS Sfaxien players
ES Zarzis players
Widzew Łódź players
Stade Gabèsien players
ES Métlaoui players
Stade Tunisien players
Al-Nahda Club (Saudi Arabia) players
Tunisian Ligue Professionnelle 1 players
Ekstraklasa players
Saudi First Division League players
Expatriate footballers in Poland
Expatriate footballers in Saudi Arabia
Tunisian expatriate sportspeople in Poland
Tunisian expatriate sportspeople in Saudi Arabia
Association football defenders